The Sinanjiang Dam is a concrete-face rock-fill dam on the Sinan River, a tributary of the Lixian River, in Mojiang Hani Autonomous County of Yunnan Province, China. The primary purpose of the dam is hydroelectric power production and it supports a 201 MW power station. Construction began in October 2003 and the river was diverted around the dam site on 5 February 2005. All three generators were commissioned in 2008. The power station contains three 67 MW Francis turbine-generators.

See also 

 List of dams and reservoirs in China
 List of tallest dams in China

References

Dams in China
Concrete-face rock-fill dams
Dams completed in 2008
Energy infrastructure completed in 2008
Hydroelectric power stations in Yunnan
Buildings and structures in Pu'er